Barannikov is a surname. Notable people with the surname include:

 Aleksey Barannikov (born 1975), Russian skier
 Serguei Barannikov (born 1972), Russian mathematician
 Velikton Barannikov (1938–2007), Soviet boxer
 Viktor Barannikov (1940–1995), Russian politician

Russian-language surnames